Universidad (also frequently called Metro C.U., from Ciudad Universitaria) is a  
station on the Mexico City Metro. It is located in the southern reaches of Mexico City, in  Coyoacán borough. A surface station, it is the current terminus of Line 3.  The station was opened on 30 August 1983. In 2021, the station had an average ridership of 25,858 passengers per day, making it the fifteenth busiest station in the network.

General information
The station logo is a crest bearing a bird with the head of a condor and of an eagle, and the legend "Por mi Raza hablará el Espíritu"; this is the official coat of arms of the Universidad Nacional Autónoma de México (UNAM), which the station serves.

This metro terminal is multimodal, connecting with microbus lines that serve zones like Tlalpan, Ajusco, Milpa Alta and Contreras. It also connects with the UNAM's internal bus base, with buses that give free service on the campus, between schools, institutes and sports facilities, including the México 68 Olympic Stadium.  It also serves the Pedregal de Santo Domingo and Copilco el Alto neighbourhoods.

Metro Universidad also has facilities for the handicapped, and a large mural depicting the history of UNAM.

Nearby
Ciudad Universitaria, main campus of the National Autonomous University of Mexico.
Museo Universitario Arte Contemporáneo, contemporary art museum.

Exits
East: Antonio Delfín Madrigal avenue, Pedregal de Santo Domingo
West: Antonio Delfín Madrigal avenue, Pedregal de Santo Domingo

Ridership

References

External links 

Universidad
Railway stations opened in 1983
Railway stations in Mexico at university and college campuses
Mexico City Metro stations in Coyoacán
1983 establishments in Mexico
Accessible Mexico City Metro stations